Erakala is a rural locality in the Mackay Region, Queensland, Australia.

History 
The locality takes its name from a railway station, which in turn was named on 12 January 1927 named by the Queensland Railways Department. It is an Aboriginal word meaning a flat.

References 

Mackay Region
Localities in Queensland